Nungu is a Plateau language of Nigeria. It divides into two dialects, Guid and Rinde (Rindre, Rindiri).

References

Ninzic languages
Languages of Nigeria